Table Mountain Glacier is in Snoqualmie National Forest in the U.S. state of Washington, to the east of Table Mountain.

See also
List of glaciers in the United States

References

Cirques of the United States
Glaciers of Whatcom County, Washington